Apsley is a rural locality in the local government areas of Central Highlands and Southern Midlands in the Central region of Tasmania. The 2016 census recorded a population of 44 for Apsley.

History
Apsley was gazetted as a locality in 1974.

Geography
The Jordan River flows through from north to south, forming small sections of the northern and southern boundaries as it enters and exits.

Road infrastructure
The A5 route (Highland Lakes Road) enters from the south-east and runs through the village to exit in the west. Route C529 (Lower Marshes Road) starts at an intersection with A5 in the village and runs north until it exits.

References

Localities of Central Highlands Council
Localities of Southern Midlands Council
Towns in Tasmania